Lynda La Plante, CBE (born Lynda Titchmarsh; 15 March 1943) is an English author, screenwriter and former actress, best known for writing the Prime Suspect television crime series.

Early life 
Lynda La Plante was born Lynda Titchmarsh on 15 March 1943 in Newton, Lancashire. La Plante's older sister Dail was killed in a road accident, at the age of five, before she was born.

Raised in Liverpool, La Plante trained for the stage at the Royal Academy of Dramatic Art. After finishing her studies, using the stage name Lynda Marchal, she appeared with the Royal Shakespeare Company in a variety of productions, as well as popular television series including Z-Cars, Educating Marmalade, The Sweeney, The Professionals, and Bergerac. As an actress she is perhaps best remembered as the hay-fever suffering ghost Tamara Novek in the BBC children's series Rentaghost. In 1974, La Plante took her first scriptwriting job on the ITV children's series The Kids from 47A.

Widows and career breakthrough 
Her breakthrough came in 1983 when she created and wrote the six-part robbery series Widows for Thames Television. The plot concerned the widows of four armed robbers carrying out a heist planned by their deceased husbands. A second series of Widows followed in 1985, while a sequel She's Out took up the story ten years later.

Her debut novel, The Legacy, was published in 1987 and received both critical and best-seller success. Her second, third and fourth novels came soon after – The Talisman (1987), Bella Mafia (1990) and Entwined (1993) – all of which became international best sellers.
In 1990 La Plante started working on her next television project, Prime Suspect, which was released by Granada in 1991. Prime Suspect starred Helen Mirren as DCI Jane Tennison, airing in the UK as well as on PBS in the United States as part of the anthology program Mystery!. In 1993 La Plante won an Edgar Award from the Mystery Writers of America for her work on the series. In 1992 she wrote a TV film called Seekers, starring Brenda Fricker and Josette Simon, produced by Sarah Lawson.

In 1993 La Plante formed her own television production company, La Plante Productions and through her new company she wrote and produced high-rating series The Governor (ITV 1995–96), Supply & Demand (ITV 1997–98), Killer Net (Channel 4 1998), acclaimed series Trial & Retribution (ITV 1997–2009), Mind Games (ITV 2001) and The Commander (ITV 2003–08). During this period La Plante also released the Cold series of books; Cold Shoulder, Cold Blood and Cold Heart, followed by Sleeping Cruelty (2000) – adding to her list of best sellers.

In 1996 La Plante co-wrote and executive produced The Prosecutors (NBC) with Tom Fontana (starring Stockard Channing), wrote and executive produced Bella Mafia (1998 CBS) (starring Vanessa Redgrave), which La Plante adapted from her novel of the same name. In 2001 she co-produced The Warden (2001 TNT), starring Ally Sheedy, a variation of La Plante's series The Governor. La Plante also co-produced her adaptation of the UK hit Widows (2002 ABC) and produced the pilot of Cold Shoulder (2006 New Regency / CBS) starring Kelly McGillis, which was based on her Cold series. La Plante was also executive producer on Daniel Petrie Jnr's adaptation of her show Framed (2002 TNT) which starred Sam Neill and Rob Lowe.

La Plante released Royal Flush (2002), and then began working on her Anna Travis series, which includes Above Suspicion (2004), The Red Dahlia (2005), Clean Cut (2007), Deadly Intent (2008), Silent Scream (2009), Blind Fury (2010), Blood Line (2011), Backlash (2012), and Wrongful Death (2013). So successful were the books that a UK television series was written and produced by La Plante starring Kelly Reilly and Ciarán Hinds.

Widows was remade as a US-set film in 2018, directed by Steve McQueen. Prime Suspect was also remade as an American series, starring Maria Bello. It ran for 13 episodes in 2011-2012.

Awards

La Plante has received many awards over the course of her career. For her work on Prime Suspect she received two Emmy Awards for Outstanding Mini Series (1993, 1994), as well as the Edgar Allan Poe Award for Best Mystery TV Episode. In 2001, the British Academy of Film and Television Arts (BAFTA) gave her the Dennis Potter Award for television writing.

In 2008 La Plante was appointed Commander of the Order of the British Empire (CBE) in the Queen's Birthday Honours List for services to Literature, Drama and to Charity. In the same year she received the TV Spielfilm Award at the International Film and Television Festival Conference in Cologne, Germany, for her television adaptation of her novel Above Suspicion.

In 2009 La Plante was inducted into the Crime Thriller Awards Hall of Fame and most recently, in 2013, La Plante was awarded an Honorary Fellowship with the Forensic Science Society (FSSoc), the first non-scientist to be inducted into the professional body; receiving the award for the accuracy with which she portrays forensic science in her work.

She has also been made an honorary member of the British Film Institute, and an Honorary Fellow from Liverpool John Moores University.

Works

Television and film 
The Kids from 47A (1973-1974) 
Widows (1983-1985)
Unnatural Causes: Hidden Talents (1986)
Screen One: Seconds Out (1992)
Civvies (1992)
Framed (1992)
Seekers (1993)
Comics (1993)
Prime Suspect (1993-2006)
The Lifeboat (1994)
She's Out (1995) (sequel to Widows)
The Governor (1995-1996)
Supply & Demand (1997-1998)
Trial & Retribution (1997-2009)
Bella Mafia (1997)
Killer Net (1998)
Cold Shoulder (2000)
Mind Games (2001)
Widows (2002) (US adaptation of the series of the same name)
The Commander (2003-2008)
Above Suspicion (2009-2012)
Prime Suspect (2011-2012) (US adaptation of the series of the same name)
Prime Suspect 1973 (2017)
Widows (2018) (Film adaptation of the TV series of the same name)

Literature 

Dolly Rawlins/Widows/Jack Warr
Widows (1983/2018)
Widows II (1985) / Widows' Revenge (2019)
She's Out (1995) 
Buried (2020)
Judas Horse (2021)
Vanished (2022)
Pure Evil (2023)

Legacy
The Legacy (1987)
The Talisman (1987)

Jane Tennison
Prime Suspect (1991)
Prime Suspect 2 (1992)
Prime Suspect 3 (1993)
Tennison (2015) (basis of British TV series Prime Suspect 1973)
Hidden Killers (2016)
Good Friday (2017)
Murder Mile (2018)
The Dirty Dozen (2019) 
Blunt Force (2020)
Unholy Murder (2021)
Dark Rooms (2022)

Lorraine Page
Cold Shoulder (1994)
Cold Blood (1996)
Cold Heart (1998)

Trial And Retribution
Trial and Retribution (1997)
Trial and Retribution II (1998)
Trial and Retribution III (1999)
Trial and Retribution IV (2000)
Trial and Retribution V (2002)
Trial and Retribution VI (2002)

Anna Travis
Above Suspicion (2004)
The Red Dahlia (2006)
Clean Cut (2007)
Deadly Intent (2008)
Silent Scream (2009)
Blind Fury (2010)
Bloodline (2011)
Backlash (2012)
 Wrongful Death (2013)

Novels
Bella Mafia (1991)
Civvies (1992)
Entwined (1992)
Framed (1992)
Seekers (1993)
Comics (1993)
The Governor (1995)
The Governor 2  (1996)
Sleeping Cruelty (2000)
Royal Flush (2002)
Twisted (2014)

Short stories
The Little One (2012)

Personal life
She was married to musician Richard La Plante for 17 years, until their divorce in 1996. At the age of 57 she adopted a baby son whose name is Lorcan.

References

External links

Lynda La Plante at the MBC Encyclopedia of Television
 Lynda La Plante biography and credits at the BFI's Screenonline

La Plante Productions

1943 births
Living people
Alumni of RADA
British women television writers
Commanders of the Order of the British Empire
Edgar Award winners
English crime fiction writers
English dramatists and playwrights
Lynda Marchal
Lynda Marchal
English television writers
English women dramatists and playwrights
English women novelists
Novelists from Liverpool
Women mystery writers